Janson is a Charleroi Metro station, located in downtown Charleroi, Belgium, in fare zone 1. It is an underground station featuring a central platform, with street access at both ends.

Interior decoration, designed by architect Jean Yernaux, is themed around the Belgian comics characters from Dupuis Publishing, a well-known Belgian comics publishing company based in Marcinelle (part of the Charleroi municipality).

The station and the nearby Paul Janson Boulevard are named after Belgian politician Paul Janson.

Nearby points of interest 

 CHU de Charleroi / Hôpital Civil hospital.
 Stade du Pays de Charleroi (soccer stadium).
 Chasseurs à pied museum, in the Trésignies barrack.
 Spirou, Fantasio and Spip roundabout
 Mambourg Polyclinic

Transfers 

TEC Charleroi bus lines 52, 71, 74, 86, 154, 158, E, City-Bus.

Charleroi Metro stations
Railway stations opened in 1996